Baeckea muricata is a species of flowering plant in the family Myrtaceae and is endemic to the south-west of Western Australia. It is found on sand plains in central areas of the Wheatbelt  region of Western Australia where it grows in sandy and gravelly clay soils.

Baeckea muricata was first formally described in 1928 by Charles Gardner in the Journal of the Royal Society of Western Australia from specimens he collected near Coolgardie in 1926. The specific epithet (muricata) means "rough with hard points".

See also
List of Baeckea species

References

Flora of Western Australia
muricata
Plants described in 1928
Taxa named by Charles Gardner